The knockout stage of the 2017 CONCACAF Gold Cup began on July 19, 2017 with the quarter-finals and ended on July 26, 2017 with the final in Santa Clara, California.

All match times listed are in EDT (UTC−4). If the venue is located in a different time zone, the local time is also given.

Format
In the quarter-finals and semi-finals, if the scores remained level after 90 minutes the match would have gone directly to a penalty shoot-out, without any extra time being played. For the final, extra time and a penalty shoot-out would have been used to determine the winners if necessary. A fourth substitution would have been allowed during extra time in the final. Unlike the 2015 edition, there was no third-place match.

CONCACAF set out the following matchups for the quarter-finals:
 Match 1: Winners Group A vs Runners-up Group B
 Match 2: Winners Group B vs 3rd Place Group A/C
 Match 3: Winners Group C vs 3rd Place Group A/B
 Match 4: Runners-up Group C vs Runners-up Group A

Combinations of matches in the quarter-finals
The specific match-ups involving the third-placed teams depended on which two third-placed teams qualified for the quarter-finals:

Qualified teams
The top two placed teams from each of the three groups, plus the two best-placed third teams, qualified for the knockout stage.

Bracket

Quarter-finals

Costa Rica vs Panama

United States vs El Salvador

Jamaica vs Canada

Mexico vs Honduras

Semi-finals

Costa Rica vs United States

Mexico vs Jamaica

Final

References

External links
 

Knockout stage